USS Sirius (AF-60) was a Alstede-class stores ship in service with the US Maritime Administration from 1943, and acquired by the United States Navy in 1956. Her task was to carry stores, refrigerated items, and equipment to ships in the fleet, and to remote stations and staging areas.

Sirius was laid down on 5 January 1942 as SS Trade Wind (MC hull 185) by Moore Dry Dock Company at Oakland, California, launched on 11 April 1942, sponsored by Mrs. Olga Johnson, and delivered to the Maritime Administration on 30 April 1943.

Service history
Sirius was acquired by the U.S. Navy from the Maritime Administration on 18 May 1956 and commissioned on 12 January 1957 at San Francisco, California. On 26 April, she sailed for Sasebo, Japan, arriving on 14 May.  Sirius spent most of her commissioned service plying between ports in the Far East and with the 7th Fleet. She supplied fleet units in Japan; Hong Kong, the Philippine Islands; Okinawa; and Taiwan. Sirius was struck from the Navy List on 1 August 1965 and returned to the Maritime Administration, and sold to West Waterway Lumber Co., Seattle, Washington, on 13 April 1971.

References

External links 
 

 

Type C2-S-B1 ships
Ships built in Oakland, California
1942 ships
World War II merchant ships of the United States
Alstede-class stores ships
Type C2-S-B1 ships of the United States Navy